Campagnola may refer to:

 Campagnola Cremasca, municipality in the Province of Cremona in the Italian region Lombardy
 Campagnola Emilia, municipality in the Province of Reggio Emilia in the Italian region Emilia-Romagna
 Fiat Campagnola, heavy-duty off-road vehicle produced by Fiat 
 Iveco Campagnola, utility 4×4 vehicle produced by Iveco
 Domenico Campagnola, Italian painter and printmaker in engraving and woodcut of the Venetian Renaissance
 Giulio Campagnola, Italian engraver and painter

See also 

 Campagna (disambiguation)
 Campagnoli (disambiguation)
 Campagnolo (disambiguation)